The Nevada County Narrow Gauge Railroad (NCNGRR) (nickname: Never Come, Never Go) was located in Northern California's Nevada County and Placer County, where it connected with the Central Pacific Railroad. The Nevada County Narrow Gauge Railroad Company incorporated on April 4, 1874, and was headquartered in Grass Valley, California. After two years of construction, passenger and commercial rail services began in 1876 and continued until 1943. The  line ran from Colfax, north through Grass Valley to Nevada City. At one time, the railroad was notable for having the highest railroad bridge in California, the Bear River Bridge, built in 1908.

History

The need for rail service in the semi-mountainous and wooded area of Grass Valley and Nevada City was precipitated by mining operations subsequent to the California Gold Rush. In addition, timber operators wanted to make their land accessible to the Southern Pacific Company in Colfax.  On January 24, 1874, Charles Marsh, who was a prominent citizen of Nevada City (he was a civil engineer and a founder of the Central Pacific Railroad) and 19 others organized a "Committee of Twenty" to build a narrow-gauge railroad from Nevada City and Grass Valley to connect with the transcontinental railroad at Colfax.  On March 20, the California legislature and Governor Newton Booth approved the right to build and operate a  narrow gauge from Colfax, through Grass Valley, to Nevada City. On June 20, an Act of Congress granted the railroad right of way through public lands.

J. H. Bates estimated that construction and equipment would total $411,132. Only one bid came in and it was for $500,000, signed by M. F. Beatty; he received a lump sum of $500,000. Construction began January 1875. Turton & Knox were subcontracted for earthwork. John Flint Kidder was the chief engineer. Within two months, 600 men were employed in the railroad's construction.

Construction included two bridges, two tunnels, and five trestles. After leaving the Colfax depot, the road headed north, parallel with the Central Pacific Railroad, then crossed Bear River, and into Nevada County. One of the first stations was at the town of You Bet, which serviced the Goodwin Drift Gravel Mine. The road proceeded into Chicago Park, a fruit and grape growers colony, and then continued into Grass Valley. All cars and locomotives had Westinghouse railway brakes, and cars used for passenger service had Miller Platform couplers. As the first contractor, Beatty, was unable to complete the project, a second, J. K. Bynre, was brought in; construction was completed in the spring of 1876. The inaugural train, from Colfax to Grass Valley, ran on April 11 and by May 20, the first train reached Nevada City.

The company's first President was John C. Coleman, president of the North Star Mine. Kidder, the builder, decided to settle down in Grass Valley, becoming the General Superintendent, and in 1884, became the second president. Upon his death in 1901, Kidder's widow, Sarah, took over, becoming the first female railroad president in the world.

In September 1907, a  "cut-off", at a cost of $132,285 was built, bettering the grade. The following year, construction was completed on the Bear River Bridge. By 1912, the NCNGRR was running three mixed trains daily, each way, between Nevada City and Colfax, while a fourth mixed train ran daily, each way, between Grass Valley and Colfax. Sarah Kidder sold her interests in 1913 and retired to San Francisco.

In 1926, Earl Taylor and his associates purchased the railroad for $1. With the outbreak of World War II, they sold it in 1942 for $251,000 to Dulian Steel Products Company and the last train to run over the line was on May 29.

Each combination coach had a small iron safe in the baggage compartment. Though $200,000,000 in gold was hauled out of Nevada County by the NCNGRR during its operation, there was never an attempted robbery.

Statistics
 Length:
 Maximum grade: 116 ft per mile (22 m pro km), 1:45.7 or 2.2%
 Minimum radius of curvature: .
 Weight: 
 Degrees of curvature: 7944
 Length of tangents: 
 Ascents from Colfax: 
 Descents from Colfax: 
 Initial rates:
 Passenger services: $0.10/mile
 Freight services: $0.20/ton/mile
 Running time:
 Absolute: 1 hour, 40 minutes
 Mixed trains: Two hours
Average stops: Four

Locomotives

Other motive power 
Engine 10 was built by Fate-Root-Heath Company of Plymouth, Ohio, and was in service only during the first six months of 1936.

Engine 11 was built by Whitcomb Manufacturing Company of Rochelle, Illinois, and was in service 1936–1942.

Notable passengers
There were several notable passengers, including presidents Ulysses S. Grant and Theodore Roosevelt, singer Emma Nevada, and Britain's Prince Albert.

Historic recognition
In the centennial year after the railroad began operations, E Clampus Vitus erected a historical marker in Colfax at  near the old NCNGRR depot, the southern end of the line. The Nevada County Narrow Gauge Railroad & Transportation Museum was created in recent years near the northern end of the line in Nevada City.

References

History of Nevada County, California
History of Placer County, California
Railway companies established in 1874
Railway companies disestablished in 1943
Railway lines opened in 1876
3 ft gauge railways in the United States
Defunct California railroads
Narrow gauge railroads in California
Transportation in Nevada County, California
Transportation in Placer County, California
Colfax, California
Grass Valley, California
Nevada City, California
1874 establishments in California